Beach Volleyball Republic, Inc. (BVR) is an organization aimed for the development and growth of beach volleyball in the Philippines formed in June 2015.

History
Co-founded by former Ateneo Lady Eagles volleybelles and current professional players Charo Soriano, Gretchen Ho, Fille Cainglet-Cayetano, Dzi Gervacio and Bea Tan. BVR organized beach volleyball tournaments in different beaches and public places in the Philippines, grassroots development program for the young and aspiring players and the professional circuit tours thru the Beach Royals program, with the first legs held at the SM Sands By the Bay court on June 20 and July 11, 2015.

In December 2015, BVR made its 4-hour live telecast debut in ABS-CBN Sports and Action with 16 women's teams competing. In 2016, BVR forged a partnership agreement with ABS-CBN Sports for 4 part magazine show and the live airing of the semifinals and finals of the program's events like the Boracay leg of the BVR on Tour on April 27–28. In June 2016, the BVR officially attempted to get  support from the Larong Volleyball sa Pilipinas (LVPI), the country's volleyball NSA, through its LVPI-sanctioned BVR Invitationals where international teams competed in a three-day event successfully held at Anguib Beach, Santa Ana, Cagayan.

In November 2020, the BVR was reportedly considered turning to a professional league. This is due government regulations at that time only allowing professional leagues to hold games amidst the COVID-19 pandemic. However, in February 2021, the league organizers forego going pro.

King and Queen of the Sands
The BVR's first tournament was the Queen of Sands tournament on June 20, 2015. The format used for the women's beach volleyball tournament allowed for players to compete with and against different players each game instead of having the same partner throughout the tournament. The top four individual players with the most points figuring in the final. Fiola Mae Caballos of Central Philippine University is the winner of the inaugural tournament. A second tournament, the King and Queen of the Sands was held in July 2015. The tournament featured both men and women.

Christmas Open
The 2015 Beach Volleyball Republic Christmas Open was held in the SM Sands By the Bay on December 19–20, 2015. The tournament involves 10 teams, which will split into two pools which will compete in a single round-robin elimination format. A draw was held before the tournament proper to determine the placings of the teams and the schedule. The top two teams will advance to a cross-over semifinals round, and the winners of the semifinals matches will move on to the finals. The winner of the open will receive 100,000 thousand pesos cash prize. Live telecast of the semifinals and finals matches was aired via ABS-CBN Sports+Action.

Participating teams

Preliminary round
Pool A

|}
Pool B

|}

Match results
Pool A

|}

Pool B

|}

Final round
Semifinals

|}

3rd place

|}

Finals

|}

Final standings

Nationwide Tour

2016
Aside from the 5 legs, BVR will organized another leg on May 20–21 for their nationwide tour before moving back to Manila for the culmination of the tour on May 26–29 at the Sands SM By the Bay. Starting with the Boracay leg, the semifinals and finals matches of the BVR on Tour events will be aired on ABS-CBN Sports+Action, the official broadcast partner of BVR.

Cabugao, Ilocos Sur
The inaugural staging of the BVR Nationwide Tour will be held on January 30–31, 2016 at the Cabugao Beach Resort, Cabugao, Ilocos Sur. 8 teams (divided into two groups) will be participated in the two-day event. The winner of the event will receive 70,000 pesos cash prize.

Final standings

San Juan, La Union
The second leg of the BVR On Tour was held at the Kahuna Beach Resort, San Juan, La Union on February 14, 2016.

Final standings

Anguib, Cagayan
The third leg of the BVR On Tour was held at the Anguib Beach, Santa Ana, Cagayan on February 20–21, in partnership with the Cagayan Grand Adventure and Leisure (CGAL) and Cagayan Economic Zone Authority (CEZA) .

Participants
Charo Soriano and Alexa Micek
Judy Caballejo and Jennifer Manzano
Jona San Pedro and Tati Sablan
Bea Tan and Dzi Gervacio
Wendy Semana and Coyah Abanto 
Jessa Aranda and Jas Wenzel
Mara Salde and Gem Seguirre
Angel Antipuesto and Melissa Gohing

Final standings

Lakawon Island, Cadiz, Negros Occidental
The fourth leg of the BVR On Tour was held on Lakawon Island, Cadiz, Negros Occidental, on March 18–19, 2016. Bea Tan and Fiola Ceballos won the fourth leg's championship match against a guest team from Iloilo.

Participants
Jonafer San Pedro and Jessa Aranda
Dzi Gervacio and Melissa Gohing
May Ann Pantino and Coyah Abanto
Bea Tan and Fiola Ceballos
Charo Soriano and Alexa Micek
Angel Antipuesto and Jennifer Manzano
Iya Yongco and Denden Lazaro
Jennifer Cosas and Erjane Magdato (Bacolod)
Jane Vorster and Tatiana Sablan (Guam)
Jackielyn Estoquia and DM Demontano (Iloilo)

Final standings

Clark, Pampanga
The fifth leg of the BVR on Tour will be held at the Villages at Global Clark, Clark Freeport Zone, Pampanga on April 16–17, 2016.

Participants
Gretchel Soltones and Alyssa Eroa
Charo Soriano and Alexa Micek
Bea Tan and Dzi Gervacio
Jona San Pedro and Jessica Aranda
Jennifer Manzano and Angel Antipuesto
Caitlin Viray and Kaitlin Gormley
Tatiana Sablan and Chloe Reimer
Denden Lazaro and Ella de Jesus
Judy Caballejo and Coyah Abanto
Michelle Morente and Janine Marciano
Pam Legaspi and Arylle Magtalas
Joy Cases and Nene Tapic

Final standings

Boracay Island, Malay, Aklan
The sixth leg of the BVR on Tour was held at Boracay Island, Malay, Aklan on April 27–28, 2016. The semifinals and finals of the leg was aired on a delayed basis on ABS-CBN Sports and Action (Channel 23 and HD 166). The tandem of Soriano and Micek emerged as the leg's champions after beating the team from the Philippine Air Force in the finals.

Participants
Charo Soriano and Alexa Micek
Judy Caballejo and Coyah Abanto
Bea Tan and Fiola Ceballos
Jackie Estoquia and DM Demontano
Dzi Gervacio and Mik Marciano
Jona San Pedro and Tatiana Sablan
Perper Cosas and Lopa Saraum
Dior Vergara and Linlyn Torado

Final standings

Bayawan
The seventh and the final leg before the national championships of the BVR on Tour was held in Bayawan, Negros Oriental on May 20–21, 2016, in partnership with the local government of Bayawan. BVR teams and some teams from Negros took part in the two-day tourney.

Final standings

2017

Metro Manila
Date: April 22–23, 2017
Location: SM Sands by the Bay, SM Mall of Asia
Leg 5 of the BVR on Tour 2017 was in SM Mall of Asia for a two-day tournament that featured both the men's and women's division.

Participating teams

Final standings
 Women's division champions – Keiko Urata and Chiyo Suzuki (Japan)
 Women's division runner-up – Bea Tan and Rupia Inck (BVR-A)
 Men's division champions – Jeremiah Barrica and Kevin Hadlocon (FEU)
 Men's division runner-up – KR Guzman and Anthony Arbasto (UST)

Currimao, Ilocos Norte
Date: May 20–21, 2017
Location: Playa Tropical Resort, Currimao, Ilocos Norte
The Ilocos Norte leg is BVR's sixth leg for this year.

Participating teams

Final standings Women's Collegiate Bracket-A

Final standings Women's Collegiate Bracket-B

Final standings Men's Division
 Bracket-A men's collegiate champions – Mohd Aizzzat Zokri and Raja Nazmi (Malaysia)
 Bracket-B men's collegiate champions – Jeremiah Barrica and Kevin Hadlocon (FEU)
 Bracket-A men's Open Invitational champions – Giovanni Musillo and Brian Nordberg (Hong Kong)
 Bracket-B men's Open Invitational champions – Jade Becaldo and Rommel Pepito (Cebu-A)

Moalboal, Cebu
Date: June 30-July 1, 2017
Location: Basdaku White Beach, Moalboal, Cebu
The Cebu leg is BVR's seventh this year and it is the final stop before the 2017 BVR National Championships happening later in July.

Participating teams

Women's

Men's

Final standings (Women's)

Final standings (Men's)

2016 National Championships
The National Championships of the Beach Volleyball Republic was held at the Sands, SM By the Bay in Pasay on May 26–27, 2016. Winning teams from different BVR legs and invited teams participated in the culmination of the 5-month long BVR nationwide tour. Qualifiers, semifinals and finals was aired also on ABS-CBN Sports+Action. Lakawon leg winners Bea Tan and Fiola Ceballos were crowned as the national champions.

Participants

Final Standings

BVR Invitational Tour
After its successful nationwide tour, BVR holds its Invitational tournament featuring 10 international teams from United States, Brazil, Singapore, Thailand, New Zealand and Hong Kong and 2 local duos (BVR shareholders Bea Tan and Charo Soriano and national championship runner-up Jennifer Cosas and Floremej Rodriguez) on June 9–11, 2016 at the Anguib Beach, Santa Ana, Cagayan. Several matches will be aired on ABS-CBN Sports and Action on June 18–19.

The Invitational tournament will be sanctioned by the Larong Volleyball sa Pilipinas, Inc. (LVPI), the country's volleyball national sports association.

Final standings

National Championships
Date: July 28–30, 2017
Location: Anguib Beach, Santa Ana, Cagayan
The winners in Cagayan will be part of the Philippines national team pool for the ASEAN games.

Participating teams

Women's

Men's

Final round

Women's

Men's

2018 Nationwide Tour

El Nido leg  
 October 27–28, 2018
 Location: Lio Beach, El Nido, Palawan
Women's champion: Charo Soriano/Bea Tan (Seda Hotels) defeated Dzi Gervacio/Roma Doromal (Perlas)
Men's champion: KR Guzman/Ian Yee defeated Hach Gilbuena/Edmar Flores (DAF-ARMM)

2021 Tour 
The Beach Volleyball Republic returned in October 2021 after a two-tear hiatus due to the COVID-19 pandemic. It will hold a two-leg tournament under a bubble format in Santa Ana, Cagayan featuring 11 men's teams and 14 women's teams.

Participating team
Men's
Creamline
PLDT
ARMY-FSD Makati
DeliRush
Tuguegarao
EVI Construction
Negros Occidental Beach Volleyball Club

Women's
Creamline
PLDT
TM
Biogenic
Eastern Communications
Toyota-Tuguegarao
Black Mamba Army
Sta. Lucia Lady Realtors
Boysen
Delimondo
Good Health-CDO

Santa Ana, Cagayan – First leg
Date: October 22–25, 2021
Location: Anguib Beach

Final standings (Women's)

Final standings (Men's)

Santa Ana, Cagayan – Second leg
Date: October 27–31, 2021
Location: Anguib Beach

See also
 Perlas Spikers

References

2015 establishments in the Philippines
2015 in Philippine sport
Beach volleyball competitions in the Philippines